Paradonea is a genus of African velvet spiders that was first described by R. F. Lawrence in 1968.

Species
 it contains five species:
Paradonea parva (Tucker, 1920) – Namibia, Botswana, South Africa
Paradonea presleyi Miller, Griswold, Scharff, Řezáč, Szűts & Marhabaie, 2012 – Zimbabwe, South Africa
Paradonea splendens (Lawrence, 1936) – Botswana, South Africa
Paradonea striatipes Lawrence, 1968 (type) – Namibia, South Africa
Paradonea variegata (Purcell, 1904) – Namibia, Botswana, South Africa

References

External links

Araneomorphae genera
Eresidae